Varvara Alexandrovna Flink (born 13 December 1996) is a Russian tennis player. She achieved a career-high WTA singles ranking of 122 on 15 July 2019 and a doubles ranking of 372 on 31 October 2022.  Flink owns one doubles title on the WTA Challenger Tour. She won her first of her six ITF singles title on 21 May 2017. In doubles, she has won two ITF titles. The first was in Monastir, Tunisia, in 2012. She reached two singles semifinals in 2013, one in Dubrovnik and the other in Seoul.

Career highlights

ITF Circuit
On the ITF Junior Circuit, Flink achieved a new career-high ranking of world No. 6, following her win at the Grade-A Copa Gerdau in Brazil in March 2013. Later that year, she achieved more success, reaching the final at the Osaka Mayor's Cup and winning the Dunlop Orange Bowl. She ended the year ranked world No. 3 junior, in January 2014, she became world No. 2.

WTA Tour
Flink made her WTA Tour debut at the 2012 Baku Cup, where she lost in the first round of the singles tournament to Tamarine Tanasugarn from Thailand, 6–3, 3–6, 2–6. In doubles, she partnered up with Patricia Mayr-Achleitner to reach the quarterfinals, where they lost to Eva Birnerova and Alberta Brianti, 4–6, 2–6.

Performance timelines

Only main-draw results in WTA Tour, Grand Slam tournaments, Fed Cup/Billie Jean King Cup and Olympic Games are included in win–loss records.

Singles

WTA 125 tournament finals

Doubles: 1 (title)

ITF Circuit finals

Singles: 11 (6 titles, 5 runner–ups)

Doubles: 2 (2 titles)

Notes

References

External links

 
 

1996 births
Living people
Russian female tennis players